The 1988 Australian Professional Championship was a professional non-ranking snooker tournament, which took place between 18 and 24 July 1988 at the Roots Hill Retired Soldiers Club in Sydney, Australia. This was the final edition of the tournament.

John Campbell won the tournament defeating Robby Foldvari 9–7 in the final.

Main draw
Results of the tournament are shown below. Winning players are denoted in bold, and numbers in parentheses show seedings. An asterisk denotes that the player was a member of the Australian Professional Association but not of the World Professional Billiards and Snooker Association.

References

Australian Professional Championship
1988 in snooker
1988 in Australian sport